Triloki Singh (10 March 1908-30 January 1980) was a freedom fighter and an Indian politician. He had served a jail term exceeding twenty years during the freedom struggle. He was a member of the Rajya Sabha, the upper house  of the Parliament of India representing Uttar Pradesh  as a member of the Indian National Congress for 3 terms during 27 April 1967 to 2 April 1968, 3 April 1970 to 2 April 1976 and from 3 April 1976 till his death. He was earlier the Leader of the Opposition in the Uttar Pradesh Legislative Assembly from 1957 to 1962 as a member of the Praja Socialist Party. He was elected from the Lucknow East constituency.

References

1908 births
1980 deaths
Rajya Sabha members from Uttar Pradesh
Indian National Congress politicians
Uttar Pradesh MLAs 1957–1962
Leaders of the Opposition in the Uttar Pradesh Legislative Assembly
Praja Socialist Party politicians